Michael Adrian Ponsor (born August 13, 1946) is a senior United States district judge of the United States District Court for the District of Massachusetts. He serves in the court's western region, in the city of Springfield.

Education

Ponsor graduated from Harvard College with a Bachelor of Arts degree in 1969, and received a Rhodes Scholarship, studying at Pembroke College, Oxford, from which he obtained a Master of Arts degree in 1971. He graduated from Yale Law School with a Juris Doctor in 1975.

Career

Ponsor served as a law clerk to Judge Joseph L. Tauro of the United States District Court for the District of Massachusetts from 1975 to 1976. He was in private practice in Boston, Massachusetts from 1976 to 1978 and in Amherst, Massachusetts from 1978 to 1983. He was an adjunct professor at Yale Law School from 1989 to 1991 and Western New England University School of Law since 1988. He served as a United States magistrate judge of the United States District Court for the District of Massachusetts from 1984 to 1994.

Federal judicial service

Ponsor was nominated to be a United States District Judge of the United States District Court for the District of Massachusetts by President Bill Clinton on November 19, 1993, to a seat vacated by Judge Frank H. Freedman. He was confirmed by the United States Senate on February 10, 1994, and received his commission on February 14, 1994. He assumed senior status on August 15, 2011. Mark Mastroianni, the District Attorney, of Hampden County, would fill the seat after a three year delay.

Award

Judge Ponsor was named as the 2015 recipient of the Golden Pen Award from the Legal Writing Institute.

The Hanging Judge

Ponsor's debut novel, The Hanging Judge, was released in December 2013 by Open Road Integrated Media. Based on his own experience presiding over a 2000 Massachusetts capital case, the first in the state in more than fifty years, this legal thriller offers an unprecedented inside view of a federal death penalty trial.

Plot: When a drive-by shooting in Holyoke, Massachusetts, claims the lives of a Puerto Rican drug dealer and a hockey mom volunteering at an inner-city clinic, the police arrest a rival gang member. With no death penalty in Massachusetts, the US attorney shifts the double homicide out of state jurisdiction into federal court so he can seek a death sentence.

The Honorable David S. Norcross, a federal judge with only two years on the bench, now presides over the first death penalty case in the state in decades. He must referee the clash of an ambitious female prosecutor and a brilliant veteran defense attorney in a high-stress environment of community outrage, media pressure, vengeful gang members, and a romantic entanglement that threatens to capsize his trial—not to mention the most dangerous force of all: the unexpected.

The One-Eyed Judge

Ponsor's second novel, The One-Eyed Judge was released in June 2017, and is the second book in the Judge Norcross Novels.

Plot: When FBI agents barge into Sidney Cranmer’s home accusing him of a heinous crime, the respected literature professor’s life becomes a nightmare. Cranmer insists the illicit material found by the agents isn’t his, but the charge against him appears airtight, and his academic specialty—the life and work of controversial author Lewis Carroll, creator of Alice’s Adventures in Wonderland—convinces investigators he’s lying.

Presiding over the case against Professor Cranmer, U.S. District Judge David Norcross fears his daily confrontation with evil has made him too jaded to become a husband and father. His girlfriend, Claire Lindemann, teaches in the same department as the defendant and is convinced of his innocence. Soon, she will take matters into her own hands. Meanwhile—with his love life in turmoil and his plans for the future on hold—a personal tragedy leaves Norcross responsible for his two young nieces. Unbeknownst to him, a vengeful child predator hovers over his new family, preparing to strike.

References

External links

Ponsor at Findlaw

1946 births
Living people
American Rhodes Scholars
Alumni of Pembroke College, Oxford
Harvard College alumni
Yale Law School alumni
Lawyers from Chicago
People from Springfield, Massachusetts
Judges of the United States District Court for the District of Massachusetts
United States district court judges appointed by Bill Clinton
United States magistrate judges
Western New England University faculty
Yale Law School faculty
20th-century American judges
21st-century American judges